Ugorelets Point (‘Nos Ugorelets’ \'nos u-go-'re-lets\) is the rocky point on the south side of the entrance to Malina Cove on the west coast of Low Island in the South Shetland Islands, Antarctica.

The point is named after the settlement of Ugorelets in Northern Bulgaria.

Location
British mapping in 2009.

Maps
 South Shetland Islands: Smith and Low Islands. Scale 1:150000 topographic map No. 13677. British Antarctic Survey, 2009.
 Antarctic Digital Database (ADD). Scale 1:250000 topographic map of Antarctica. Scientific Committee on Antarctic Research (SCAR). Since 1993, regularly upgraded and updated.

References
 Ugorelets Point. SCAR Composite Antarctic Gazetteer.
 Bulgarian Antarctic Gazetteer. Antarctic Place-names Commission. (details in Bulgarian, basic data in English)

External links
 Ugorelets Point. Copernix satellite image

Headlands of the South Shetland Islands
Bulgaria and the Antarctic